The Gift: Forms and Functions of Exchange in Archaic Societies is a 1925 essay by the French sociologist Marcel Mauss that is the foundation of social theories of reciprocity and gift exchange.

History 
Mauss's original piece was entitled Essai sur le don. Forme et raison de l'échange dans les sociétés archaïques ("An essay on the gift: the form and reason of exchange in archaic societies") and was originally published in L'Année Sociologique in 1925. The essay was later republished in French in 1950 and translated into English in 1954 by Ian Cunnison, in 1990 by W. D. Halls, and in 2016 by Jane I. Guyer.

Argument 
Mauss's essay focuses on the way that the exchange of objects between groups builds relationships between humans.

It analyzes the economic practices of archaic societies and finds that they have a common as well as a main practice centered on reciprocal exchange. In different archaic and indigenous societies, he finds evidence contrary to the presumptions of modern Western societies about the history and nature of exchange which assert that it is a relatively newer concept and practice. He shows that early exchange systems center around the obligations to give, to receive, and, most importantly, to reciprocate. They occur between groups, not only individuals, and they are a crucial part of “total phenomena” that work to build not just wealth and alliances marked by economic wants but social solidarity because “the gift” pervades all aspects of the society. He uses a comparative method, drawing upon published secondary scholarship on peoples from around the world, but especially the Pacific Northwest (especially potlatch).

After examining the reciprocal gift-giving practices of each society, he finds in them common features, despite some variation.  From the disparate evidence, he builds a case for a foundation to human society based on collective (vs. individual) exchange practices. In doing so, he refutes the English tradition of liberal thought, such as utilitarianism, as distortions of human exchange practices. He concludes by speculating that social welfare programs may be recovering some aspects of the morality of the gift within modern market economies.

Influence 
The Gift has been very influential in anthropology, where there is a large field of study devoted to reciprocity and exchange. It has also influenced philosophers, artists, and political activists, including Georges Bataille, Jacques Derrida, Jean Baudrillard, and more recently the work of David Graeber and the theologians John Milbank and Jean-Luc Marion.

See also
 Gift economy
 De Beneficiis

References

Further reading 
 Georges Bataille, The Accursed Share (New York: Zone Books, 1988 [orig. pub. 1949]).
 Claude Lévi-Strauss, Introduction to the Work of Marcel Mauss (London: Routledge, 1987 [orig. pub. 1950]).
 Jacques Derrida, Given Time 1: Counterfeit Money (Chicago & London: University of Chicago Press, 1992 [orig.  pub. 1991]).
 Jean Baudrillard, Symbolic Exchange and Death (Sage Publications (CA), Oct 1, 1993 [orig. pub. 1976]).
 Lewis Hyde, The Gift: Imagination and the Erotic Life of Property (New York: Vintage, 2007 [orig. pub. 1983]).
 Bronisław Malinowski, Argonauts of the Western Pacific (Available online, [orig. pub. 1922]).
 What happened to Coffee Brand Gifts after Shark Tank Retrieved 16 January 2023.

External links
 1954 translation
 1990 translation
 Original text (in French)

1925 essays
French essays
Anthropological essays
Sociology books
Giving